William H. Crogman (May 5, 1841 - October 16, 1931) was a pioneering African American educator and classicist at Clark University of Atlanta in the United States. The William H Crogman School in Atlanta is named for him.

Early life and education
William Henry Crogman was born May 5, 1841 in Philipsburg, Sint Maarten an island in the Dutch Caribbean. He was orphaned at 12 and moved to the United states at the age of 14 with a man named B. L. Boomer. He attended schools in Massachusetts and had the chance to travel the world, visiting ports in Asia, Europe, Australia, and South America. After the American Civil War (1861-1865), he entered Pierce Academy in Middleborough, Massachusetts led by J. W. R. Jenks. He finished his study, and in 1870, started teaching at Claflin University in Orangeburg, South Carolina. After three years of teaching, in 1873, he enrolled at Atlanta University and in 1876 graduated as a part of the first class of the school. He then took a position at Clark University of Atlanta where he became professor of Greek and Latin. He was the first person to receive a Doctor of Letters from Atlanta University, which was awarded as an honorary degree. He also received an honorary Doctor of Laws.

Career
He was a gifted orator and gave numerous important speeches, including a speech before the American Missionary Association at Chicago and the Freedmen's Aid Society of the Methodist Episcopal church at Ocean Grove, New Jersey in the early 1880s. In 1883, he gave two speeches from Henry Ward Beecher's pulpit at Plymouth Church in Brooklyn, New York which were printed in pamphlet form.

In the mid 1880s, he was a delegate to the National Association of Teachers convention in Madison, Wisconsin and as a layman represented the Savannah Conference in the General Conference of the Methodist Episcopal church. In 1884, he was elected secretary of the conference. He was also appointed a delegate to the Ecumenical Council of Methodism in London. In 1892, the General Conference selected him to be a member of a University Senate chosen by the bishops to determine the minimum requirements for the baccalaureate degree from associated schools.

He was highly respected and beloved at Clark University, and worked for equality in education and civil rights. Rather than ride segregated streetcars, he walked the several miles between his home and the campus. He was secretary of the Board of Trustees at Clark for many years.  From 1903 to 1910, he was president at the school.

In 1895, he was a driving force behind the Negro exhibit at the Cotton Exposition in Atlanta and was Chief Exposition Commissioner for African Americans from Georgia. He was also a trustee at the Gammon Theological Seminary He was a participant in the March 5, 1897 meeting to celebrate the memory of Frederick Douglass which founded the American Negro Academy led by Alexander Crummell.

Later life, death, and legacy

Crogman retired in 1921 and was awarded a lifetime pension by the Carnegie Foundation.

He was married to a woman named Lavina Mott. When he retired, he moved to Philadelphia and lived with his daughter, Lottie Crogman Wright. Wright was the wife of Richard Wright, president of Wilberforce University in Ohio. He had two other daughters, Edith and Ada. Crogman died in Kansas City, Missouri on October 16, 1931, followed in a few days by his wife. He was buried in Atlanta.

Clark also erected the gothic Crogman Chapel in his honor. The William H. Krogman Cottage is named after him.

References

Further reading
W. H. Crogman Talks for the Times South Atlanta, Georgia: Franklin, 1896, 45-69.

Works
Crogman, W. H. (1884) Negro Education: Its Helps and Hindrances
Crogman, William Henry. Talks for the Times. Press of Franklin Printing & Publishing Company, 1896.

External links

 
 

1841 births
1931 deaths
American people of West Indian descent
African-American educators
African-American people
Classics educators
American educators
Activists for African-American civil rights
20th-century African-American people